The 1943 Kansas Jayhawks football team represented the University of Kansas in the Big Six Conference during the 1943 college football season. In their first season under head coach Henry Shenk, the Jayhawks compiled a 4–5–1 record (2–3 against conference opponents), tied for fourth place in the conference, and were outscored by opponents by a combined total of 107 to 96. They played their home games at Memorial Stadium in Lawrence, Kansas.

The team's statistical leaders included Bob George with 180 rushing yards and 288 passing yards, Charlie Moffatt with 230 receiving yards, and Bob Carson with 25 points scored (four touchdowns and one extra point). George Dick was the team captain.

Schedule

References

Kansas
Kansas Jayhawks football seasons
Kansas Jayhawks football